{

Taranis miranda is a species of sea snail, a marine gastropod mollusk in the family Raphitomidae.

Description
The length of the shell attains 3.8 mm, its diameter 1.7 mm.

Distribution
This marine species is endemic to South Africa and occurs off the Agulhas Bank, from off Cape Agulhas to off Cape Recife, at depths of 80–125 m.

References

External links
 
 R. N. Kilburn, Turridae (Mollusca: Gastropoda) of southern Africa and Mozambique. Part 5. Subfamily Taraninae; Ann. Natal Mus. Vol. 32 Pages 325-339 Pietermaritzburg October. 1991

Endemic fauna of South Africa
miranda
Gastropods described in 1925